The Hundred Days was Napoleon Bonaparte's final military campaign in 1815.

(The) Hundred Days may also refer to:

 The Hundred Days (novel), an Aubrey–Maturin novel by Patrick O'Brian, set during Napoleon's 1815 campaign
Hundred Days (album), a 2009 album by JJ Lin
 Hundred Days Offensive, the Allies final push at the end of World War I
 Canada's Hundred Days, the last 96 days of World War I
 Hundred Days' War, an extended battle in the Lebanese Civil War
 Hundred Days' Reform, a 1898 reform program in China
"A Hundred Days", an episode of the TV series Stargate SG-1
One Hundred Days or 100 Days may refer to:

 100 Days (1991 film), an Indian thriller film
 100 Days (2001 film), a film about the Rwandan Genocide
 100 Days (2013 film)
 100 Days (2016 TV series), a Marathi language television series
 100 Days to Heaven or 100 Days, a 2011 Philippine television series
 Beyond 100 Days, previously known as 100 Days, a BBC News current affairs programme
 "100 Days", the first term (1834–1835) of British prime minister Robert Peel
 "100 Days", the 1994 Rwandan genocide
 One Hundred Days: Memoirs of the Falklands Battle Group Commander, a book by Admiral Sandy Woodward
 One Hundred Days: My Unexpected Journey from Doctor to Patient, a 2000 book by David Biro
 One Hundred Days: The Story of Architects Almost World Tour, a documentary about British metalcore band Architects' 2012 tour
 "One Hundred Days", a song by Mark Lanegean from Bubblegum
 One Hundred Days, a band led by Ian Tanner
 One Hundred Days Government, the first government of Cuban president Ramón Grau

See also

First hundred days (disambiguation)
Hundred Years' War
One Hundred Years of Solitude